The 2021 Khelo India Youth Games is the fourth edition, of the Khelo India Youth Games (KIYG). After being postponed thrice due to COVID-19, the Khelo India Youth Games 2021 were held from 4–13 June 2022 across multiple venues. Haryana hosted the bulk of the events and Panchkula, Haryana, India is named as the host city. The event witnessed 25 national-level multidisciplinary grassroots games. The event was held in 25 disciplines and all of India’s 36 states and Union Territories participated at the KIYG for the first time. Khelo India programme's inaugural edition was held in New Delhi in 2018, while Pune and Guwahati hosted 2nd and 3rd edition in 2019 and 2020 respectively. The winner of the fourth edition of KIYG was Haryana who edged past defending champions Maharashtra who finished 2nd. Karnataka for the first time finished in the 3rd position. Sikkim, Nagaland, and Lakshadweep were the only participants not to win a single medal.

Sports events 
There are 25 sports disciplines in Khelo India Youth Games 2021. five new indigenous sports, mallakhamb, gatka, kalaripayattu, thang-ta and yogasana, have been added to the sports list for the 2021 edition.

Medals tally 

The medal tally of the 4th edition of Khelo India Youth Games is listed below. The host state, Haryana, is highlighted.

References

Multi-sport events in India
Khelo India
2021 in youth sport
2021 in Indian sport